A sanitary engineer may be either:

a highly trained professional in the field of sanitary engineering
a humorous euphemism for a waste collector, a field of work that requires less specialized education